Events from the year 1557 in art.

Events
Painter Biagio Betti becomes a monk of the order of the Theatines of San Silvestro al Quirinale, most of his works being found in the monastery of that order in Rome.

Works

Sofonisba Anguissola
Family Portrait: Minerva, Amilcare and Asdrubale Anguissola
Portrait of Bianca Ponzoni Anguissola, the artist's mother (Staatliche Museen, Berlin)
 Federico Barocci – Martyrdom of St. Sebastian (Urbino Cathedral)
 Giovanni Battista Moroni – Portrait of a Man before the Virgin and Child
 Lattanzio Gambara – Apollo
 Joan de Joanes – Portrait of Alfonso V, King of Aragon
 Tintoretto – Tamar and Judah
 Daniele da Volterra – Massacre of the Innocents

Births
June 10 - Leandro Bassano, Venetian artist and younger brother of Francesco Bassano the Younger (died 1622)
August 16 - Agostino Carracci, Italian painter and printmaker (died 1602)
September 16 - Pietro Tacca, Italian sculptor and follower of Giambologna (died 1640)
December 23 - Giovanni Battista Crespi, Italian painter, sculptor and architect (died 1632)
date unknown
Alessandro Capriolo, Italian engraver and printer (died unknown)
probable (born 1557/1560) - Benedetto Bandiera, Italian painter (died 1634)

Deaths
January 2 - Pontormo, Italian Mannerist painter and portraitist from the Florentine school (born 1494)
January 3 - Giacomo Raibolini, Italian painter (born 1484)
July 16 - Vincenzo degli Azani, Italian painter (date of birth unknown)
October 5 - Francesco Bacchiacca, Florentine Mannerist painter (born 1494)
date unknown
Giovanni del Giglio, Italian painter
Lorenzo Lotto, Italian painter, draughtsman and illustrator (born 1480)
Giacomo Raibolini, Italian painter (born 1484)

 
Years of the 16th century in art